Shirali is a village in Bhatkal taluk of Uttara Kannada district in Karnataka. Shirali is home to two prominent temples: the Chitrapur Math and the Maha Ganapathi Mahammaya Temple. The Chitrapur Math is the holiest temple of the Chitrapur Saraswat Brahmin community, and the Maha Ganapathi Mahammaya temple is the Kuladev to the Kamaths, Bhats, Puraniks, Prabhus, Joishys, Mallyas, Kudvas and Nayak families from the Goud Saraswat Brahmin community.

Etymology
The name Shirali is derived from Sanskrit Shrivalli, which means wealthy. The shrine of Goddess Shrivalli Bhuvaneshwari inside the premises of Chitrapur Math signifies the origin of the name  Shirali.

Geography
It has an average elevation of 12 meters (42 ft).
Nearest towns-
On the South is Bhatkal and Baindur. 
On the North is another temple town, Murudeshwar .

Transportation

Road
Shirali is on the National Highway No. 66 (the highway that runs from Mumbai to Thiruvananthapuram). A large number of Karnataka State Transport buses pass through Shirali. Private transport buses using NH17 also provide facility to reach Shirali.
From the main road (highway) of Shirali, Shri Chitrapur Math and the Maha Ganapathi Temple are about 2 km in the interior, for which auto-rickshaws are available. Distances to Shirali from some of the major cities are: 
 Bangalore 506 km
 Mangalore 156 km
 Goa (Panaji) 225 km
 Mumbai 952 km
 Pune 780 km
 Bhatkal 03 km

Rail
On the Konkan Railway line, the nearest railway stations are Chitrapur, Murudeshwar and Bhatkal (both about 6 km from Shirali to the north and south respectively). Autorickshaws, buses and other modes of road transport are available to reach Shirali from either of the railway stations.
The Mangalore-Verna stops at Chitrapur station at 9.39 a.m.and Verna-Mangalore trains stops at 17:03 p.m.

Air
The nearest airport is Mangalore (156 km) and the next closest is Dabolim Airport in Goa (200 km).

Climate

See also
 Maha Ganapathi Mahammaya Temple

References

External links
 Chitrapur Math

Villages in Uttara Kannada district